Lee Myeong-su (born 10 July 1957) is a South Korean weightlifter. He competed in the men's featherweight event at the 1984 Summer Olympics.

References

1957 births
Living people
South Korean male weightlifters
Olympic weightlifters of South Korea
Weightlifters at the 1984 Summer Olympics
Place of birth missing (living people)
Asian Games medalists in weightlifting
Weightlifters at the 1978 Asian Games
Weightlifters at the 1986 Asian Games
Asian Games silver medalists for South Korea
Asian Games bronze medalists for South Korea
Medalists at the 1978 Asian Games
Medalists at the 1986 Asian Games
20th-century South Korean people
21st-century South Korean people